

Alfred Bülowius was a German general during World War II. He was a recipient of the Knight's Cross of the Iron Cross of Nazi Germany.

Awards

 Knight's Cross of the Iron Cross on 4 July 1940 as Oberst and Geschwaderkommodore of (K)Lehrgeschwader 1
 German Cross in Cross in Gold on 9 December 1942 as Generalmajor in the Flieger-Division 1

Notes

References

Citations

Bibliography

 
 
 

1892 births
1968 deaths
Military personnel from Königsberg
Luftwaffe World War II generals
Recipients of the Gold German Cross
Recipients of the Knight's Cross of the Iron Cross
German Army personnel of World War I
Prussian Army personnel
Generals of Aviators
20th-century Freikorps personnel